The visa policy of Jordan deals with the requirements which a foreign national wishing to enter Jordan must meet to be permitted to travel to, enter and remain in the country.

Jordanian visas are issued by the Ministry of Foreign Affairs and its diplomatic missions abroad with the stated goal of regulating and facilitating migratory flows.

Visitors to Jordan must obtain a visa from a Jordanian diplomatic mission unless they come from one of the 10 visa-exempt countries and territories or one of the 120 countries and territories whose citizens are eligible for a visa on arrival.

Citizens of member nations of the Gulf Cooperation Council, Lebanon, and Turkey may travel to Jordan without visa limits for a maximum stay of 3 months in a 6 month period. However, citizens of Egypt and residents of the Palestinian Authority have visa free access for one month in a 6 month period, while citizens of Israel have visa free access for one month with unlimited times in a 6 month period. All visitors must hold a passport valid for 6 months beyond the period of intended stay and with two blank pages. Visitors to Jordan must hold a non-refundable return or circle trip tickets except for Government workers continuing to Iraq. An identity card is accepted in lieu of a passport for Lebanese citizens, and EU citizens (except Croatians) arriving at Aqaba airport on a direct flight from Brussels.

Visa policy countries map

Visa exemption 
The following citizens do not require a visa to enter, reside, study, and work indefinitely in the Hashemite Kingdom of Jordan without any immigration requirements:

1 – May enter with a Jordanian Identity Card or an expired Jordanian passport.

Visa free-access
Holders of passports of the following 12 countries and territories do not require a visa to visit Jordan up to 3 months per a 6 months for tourism or business purposes (unless otherwise stated). An identity document is accepted in lieu of a passport for Lebanese citizens:

1 –Provided that the passport's number does not start with "00". 

Visa is not required for holders of diplomatic passports issued by any country or territory except Iraq and Myanmar.
Visa is not required for holders of special passports issued by Russia for a maximum stay of 60 days.
The residence permit should be valid for a minimum of 6 months and they must hold a non-refundable return or circle trip tickets.
Visa is not required for citizens of Iraq being crew members on duty.
Visa is not required for merchant seamen and crew members of all countries and territories except Myanmar arriving by air in order to board a ship, or if arriving by ship in order to board an aircraft, provided they are traveling on duty and are holding a Letter of Employment or Letter of Guarantee of the shipping company.
Visa is not required for holders of a Laissez-Passer Passport issued by the United Nations provided they are traveling on duty and are holding a security clearance issued by the Jordanian Ministry of Interior.
Visa is not required for members of the US military or personnel of the Department of Defense (DoD) provided they are holding a US Military ID card (i.e.CAC card) and a travel order.

Visa on arrival
Citizens of countries and territories other than the following listed below and the countries and territories whose citizens are visa exempt can obtain a visa on arrival for a JOD 40.- for a maximum stay of 2 months (30 days for citizens of Algeria, Hong Kong, Japan, India, Morocco, South Africa and South Korea) and single entry:

Visa on arrival are not issued to holders of emergency, temporary, or ordinary passports issued by the following countries and territories: 

1-visa on arrival only if holding residence permits issued by, a GCC Member States, Switzerland an EEA Member state, Australia, Canada, Japan, South Korea or a Permanent Resident Card (Form I-551) issued by the USA. The residence permit should be valid for a minimum of 6 months and they must hold a non-refundable return or circle trip tickets.

2-visa on arrival if traveling for medical treatment for female or male older than 50 years and younger than 15 years

3-visa on arrival if holding a residence permit issued by a country whose citizens can obtain a visa on arrival for a maximum stay of 2 months. residence permit valid for a minimum of 6 months from the arrival date

4-Malaysia and Jordan had sign an agreement for the partial visa abolishment. Based on reciprocal between two countries, Malaysian can get visa on arrival, which is issued FOC for stay as tourist for 1 months. Renewal are allow for another 1 month at the Passport and Visa Department. 

Special provisions exist regarding the visa on arrival for the citizens of the following countries and territories:
 – visa on arrival if provided holding an ID-card, a certificate of nationality, an official "Businessmen card" issued by the government of Jordan, and an official letter confirming the attendance to conferences or workshops, issued to official delegates entering or transiting Jordan or holding a residence permit issued by a country whose citizens can obtain a visa on arrival(except Lebanon) for 1 month maximum stay. Visa on arrival for holders of service passports.
 – visa on arrival for aged between the age of 17 and 35 years of age.
 - visa on arrival for holders of diplomatic passports.
 – visa on arrival for a maximum stay of 2 months provided traveling on Royal Jordanian Airlines (RJ) and are holding hotel reservation in a 3 to 5 star hotel and an official documents confirming business or official delegate status.

Accompanying staff (housemaids, drivers), traveling with their employer, can obtain a visa on arrival for a max. stay of 3 months however this is not applicable for holders of ordinary passports issued by Myanmar, Libya, Syria and Yemen.
Visa on arrival for holders of an Interpol passport provided they are traveling on duty. The Interpol office in Amman must be notified prior to departure.

Emergency Certificate
  - Jordan does not recognize the Malaysian Emergency Certificate. Transit inside the Queen Alia Terminal Airport is allowed but not to go out of the terminal. Malaysians who holding Emergency Certificate require Single Journey Travel from issued country to Malaysia.

Transit
A transit visa is not required if holding a confirmed onward ticket for a flight to a third country within 48 hours.

Visitor statistics
Most visitors arriving to Jordan were from the following countries of nationality:

See also

Visa requirements for Jordanian citizens

References

External links
Visit Jordan

Jordan
Foreign relations of Jordan